Chiltern Green railway station was built by the Midland Railway in 1868 on its extension to St. Pancras.

The station was located in New Mill End but took its name from the small hamlet of Chiltern Green about a mile away.  Adjacent to it was the GNR station of Luton Hoo also located in New Mill End. The small hamlet of New Mill End is unique in having two railway stations (Chiltern Green and Luton Hoo) neither of which, after 1 December 1891, were named after the village they served.  The two lines ran side by side at this point: the Midland into Luton Midland Road and the GNR from Hatfield into Luton Bute Street.

The station buildings survive to this day as a private home. The platform on the station building side partly survives but is overgrown and difficult to see when passing in a train. The other platform was removed when the line was electrified.

Stationmasters

W. Barker 1870 - 1873 
F. Christian 1873 - 1875
G. Evans 1875 - 1881
W.H. Higginson 1881 - 1888
R. Cotterill 1888 - 1890
David Gilliver 1890 - 1893
George William Bland 1893 - 1922 
F.J. Aldridge 1922 - 
F. Butler until 1933 (also station master at Luton, afterwards station master at Walsall)
A.J. Hawkrigg until 1937 (afterwards station master at Doe Hill)

References

Former Midland Railway stations
Railway stations in Great Britain opened in 1868
Railway stations in Great Britain closed in 1952
Disused railway stations in Bedfordshire